The 59040 Vapi - Virar Shuttle is a passenger train of the Indian Railways connecting  in Gujarat and  of Maharashtra. It is currently being operated with 59040 train number on a daily basis.

Service

The 59040/Vapi - Virar Shuttle has average speed of 48 km/hr and covers 113 km in 2 hrs 20 mins.

Route 

Coach composite

The train consists of 18 coaches:

 16 General Unreserved(GEN)
 2 Seating cum Luggage Rake(SLR)

Traction

Train is hauled by a Locomotive shed, Vadodara  based WAP-5 or Locomotive shed, Valsad based WAG-5P.

Rake Sharing

The train shares its rake with 59037/59038 Virar - Surat Passenger, 59039 Virar - Valsad Shuttle, 59045 Bandra Terminus - Vapi Passenger, 59046 Valsad - Bandra Terminus Passenger.

External links 

 59040/Vapi - Virar Shuttle

References 

Vapi
Rail transport in Gujarat
Rail transport in Maharashtra
Slow and fast passenger trains in India